This Week was a British weekly current affairs television programme that was first produced for ITV in January 1956 by Associated-Rediffusion (later Thames Television), running until 1978, when it was replaced by TV Eye. In 1986, the earlier name was revived and This Week continued until Thames lost its franchise at the end of 1992.

In September 1958, This Week filmed George Harrison Marks and Pamela Green at their photography studio in Gerrard Street. David Kentick directed and Nick Barker interviewed Marks and Green. They were filmed working with a nude model, who was strategically covered by a very long wig. The film sequence ended with a montage of their photographs, mostly of nudes. However, the night it was to be broadcast Pope Pius XII died and the programme was cut, and the interview never shown. In 1964, This Week returned to their studio. This time round they showed a clip of the infamous striptease comedy film The Window Dresser.

However, its most influential episode was an exposé on the National Front in 1974, which led to the party's members firing their Chairman John Tyndall and National Activities Organiser Martin Webster two weeks later as a result of the revelations on the show from former NF Chairman John O'Brien of their neo-Nazi paramilitary pasts and continued links.

In 1976 the episode Death in the West believed to contain the first recorded admission from a tobacco company representative that smoking causes health problems resulted in an injunction from Philip Morris International.

The most controversial edition was "Death on the Rock", a 1988 documentary which questioned the official account of the Gibraltar shootings. It is commonly believed this programme was responsible for Thames losing their broadcast franchise.

During its run, the programme's presenters included Ludovic Kennedy, James Cameron, Jonathan Dimbleby, Robert Kee, Dan Farson, Jeremy Thorpe (who became leader of the Liberal Party), Kenneth Harris, Desmond Wilcox, Llew Gardner, Bryan Magee, Peter Taylor (noted for his coverage of Northern Ireland), Denis Tuohy, John Morgan, Peter Williams, Yvonne Roberts and John Edwards. 

The programme used the Intermezzo from Sibelius's Karelia Suite as a signature tune.

See also
 Peter Morley

References

External links
 
 

1950s British television series
1956 British television series debuts
1960s British television series
1970s British television series
1978 British television series endings
1986 British television series debuts
1992 British television series endings
English-language television shows
Television series by Fremantle (company)
Television shows produced by Thames Television
Television shows produced by Associated-Rediffusion